Atom Heart Mother (translit. Madare ghalb atomi) is a 2013 produced Iranian film that has been released at the Berlin Film Festival 2015. It was a nominee at the 17th Buenos Aires International Festival of Independent Cinema, the LA Film Festival and the 2015 Odessa International Film Festival, and screened at the 65th Berlin International Film Festival, the 16th San Diego Asian Film Festival and the Zurich Film Festival, but was only permitted for screening in Iran in 2017, after some modifications required by the Ministry of Culture and Islamic Guidance.

Title 
The title of the film is a reference to a song by Pink Floyd.

Plot 
The plot is set at the beginning days of  Mahmoud Ahmadinejad's "Subsidy Reform Plan", and spans one single night. Two friends, Arineh and Nobahar, cruise the streets of Tehran after leaving a party at Midnight. After meeting their friend, Kami, who is planning to immigrate from Iran, they cause a road accident. A mysterious stranger, Toofan, tells them he has settled the accident issue by paying off the other driver. Here the plot shifts from realistic to  spooky and metaphysical, when Toofan keeps on re-appearing, talking about dead dictators, weapons of mass destruction and parallel worlds.

The director said about the movie, after its screening at the Berlin Festival:

Cast 
 Pegah Ahangarani as Nobahar
 Taraneh Alidoosti as Arineh
 Mohammad Reza Golzar as Toofan and the narrator
 Mehrdad Sedighiyan as Kami
 Ehsan Amani

References

External links
 The original, 2015 version: 
 

Iranian drama films